Savva Readya Vanga is a higher secondary school in Rasipuram in the Namakkal District of Tamil Nadu, India.

References

High schools and secondary schools in Tamil Nadu
Education in Namakkal district